Reindeer Island is an island located in the north basin of Lake Winnipeg, in the Canadian province of Manitoba, closer to the western shore of the lake. Uninhabited by people, it was named Manitoba's first ecological reserve in May 1976, and was created under The Crown Lands Act.

Geography 
While Reindeer Island lacks a weather station, the entirety of southern Manitoba has a four-season humid continental climate with strong seasonal differences. Winters lack any moderation since the lake freezes over for several months, whereas at onshore stations nearer the north of the lake such as Grand Rapids see seasonal lag in spring and lower diurnal temperature variation in summer than in Winnipeg and the provinces' southern landmass, likely to be even stronger on an offshore island within the lake.

Flora and fauna 
It was thought that the Caspian tern used the west coast of Reindeer Island as a breeding ground, as discovered by Eric Dunlop, a naturalist, who was collecting samples for the Carlisle Museum in Carlisle, England during 1914 and 1915.

References

Islands of Lake Winnipeg
Uninhabited islands of Canada
Ecological reserves of Manitoba
Nature reserves in Manitoba
Protected areas of Manitoba